Enallagma semicirculare, the claw-tipped bluet, is a species of damselfly generally found in Mexico and the southwestern United States (Arizona and New Mexico). It has also been sighted in southern Texas.

References

Coenagrionidae
Odonata of North America
Taxa named by Edmond de Sélys Longchamps
Insects described in 1876